Daniel Herbert was born 6 February 1974 in Brisbane, Queensland, Australia. He won 67 caps playing at centre for the Australian rugby union side since 1994. He made his test debut at the age of 20 against Ireland on 11 June 1994. He battled Jason Little for a state and test spot  alongside Tim Horan before displacing him in 1998. Herbert went on to establish himself as the world's premier outside centre and was a key member of the Australian side that won the 1999 Rugby World Cup.

Herbert was named in the 'Team of the World Cup 1999' alongside his centre partner, Tim Horan. Herbert was also awarded the coveted 'L'equipe International Player of the Year' in 1999. In 2001 Herbert was promoted to the role of Queensland Captain and Australian Vice-captain and in that same year scored a brace of tries in the third and deciding British Lions test  and helped the Wallabies to their first ever series victory over the Lions.
Known for his aggressive defence and line-breaking ability, Herbert revolutionised the role of a modern-day outside centre.

He was a vital part of the 'Golden Era' of Australian Rugby, which celebrated a World Cup victory, a British Lions series victory, a Rugby Championship and five consecutive Bledisloe Cups.

Herbert amassed 124 caps for Queensland Reds before leaving for the French side USA Perpignan for the season 2003–04. He only played 7 matches with Perpignan and suffered a very serious neck injury, which resulted in surgery in April 2004 and subsequently in Herbert's retirement from the game.

His brother Anthony was also an Australian rugby union representative player.

References

External links 
Daniel Herbert on Sporting Heroes
Audio interview on Australian rugby and the World Cup

1974 births
Australian rugby union players
Australia international rugby union players
Queensland Reds players
Living people
Rugby union centres
Rugby union players from Brisbane